Aidone (Gallo-Italic of Sicily: Aidungh or Dadungh) is a town and comune in the province of Enna, in region of Sicily in southern Italy. The  extensive archaeological site of Morgantina is on a ridge close to the town. 

There are a variety of etymologies proposed for the name of the town. One suggests putatively derives from the Arabic Ay dun meaning mountain of water.

See also
 Lombards of Sicily
 Ottavio Profeta

Main sights
 Archaeological site of Morgantina
 Church of Santa Maria la Cava
 Mother Church of San Lorenzo
 The Regional Archaeological Museum of Aidone contains many archaeological remains from Morgantina.

References

 

Municipalities of the Province of Enna
Articles which contain graphical timelines